Felipe Pantone (born 1986) is an Argentine-Spanish contemporary artist. He was born in Buenos Aires, Argentina and raised in southeast Spain. Pantone's body of work is based in kinetic art, installations, graffiti, and design, characterized by “use of bold colors, geometrical patterns, and Op Art elements.” His combinations recall “bright colored typography, 80s Synth pop music, and SMPTE color bars on the TV.”

History 
Pantone began doing graffiti as Pant1 in Torrevieja, Spain, then moved to Valencia at the age of 18, where he started painting with the D.O.C.S crew and later became part of UltraBoyz (UB). He became known for his avant-garde cursive handstyle.

Pantone began showing his work in galleries in 2006. It has since appeared on buildings, walls and in galleries worldwide, from the Mesa Contemporary Arts Center to the Long Beach Museum of Art, the Palais de Tokyo in Paris, as well as in Mexico City, Osaka, Lisbon, Palestine, Italy, and Australia. Pantone has been featured in various forms of media, including Reebok's "Always a Classic" campaign. He used a 1994 Corvette as a canvas for his pixelated graphics, a piece presented in the exhibit Beyond the Streets. The piece is now known as "Ultradynamic".

Style 

Pantone often works in gradients, blending geometric shapes with neon colors and white and blacks, with critics noting "The divisions between geometric patterns and gradients are so effortlessly blended that the larger patterns seem created with digitization rather than with two hands." He cites the Parisian Grim Team and UltraBoyz crews as early influences.

Forbes magazine called his aesthetic "the intersection of Blade Runner and PhotoShop" for its concepts of dynamism, transformation and movement. Others have said he has created a new visual dialogue derived from his infatuation with the digital age, comparing his work to Venezuelan Op artist Carlos Cruz-Diez's chromatic linework and the geometric graphics of Jonathan Zawada.

Exhibitions

Solo exhibitions

2015 
 Stereodynamica - Backwoods Gallery, Melbourne AUSTRALIA
 Opticromías - Delimbo, Sevilla SPAIN
 Resituation - Constant, Hong Kong CHINA

2016 

 Scroll Panorama - Celaya Brothers Gallery, Mexico D.F, Mexico
 Cyberspazio Tubolare - Outdoor Festival, Rome, Italy
 Data Somersault - StolenSpace Gallery, London
 Data Smog - Lebenson Gallery, Paris
 W3-Dimensional - Mirus Gallery, San Francisco, CA

2017 

 Afterimage - Kolly Gallery, Zurich, Switzerland
 Planned Iridescence - GR Gallery, New York, NY
 Planar Direction - Station16 Gallery, Montreal, Canada
 Artifact to Human Communication - Underdogs Gallery, Lisbon, Portugal

2018 

 Excès de Vitesse - Alice Gallery, Brussels, Belgium
 Dynamic Phenomena - Magda Danysz Gallery, Paris
 W3-DIMENSIONAL PARK - Siam Center, Bangkok, Thailand
 Transformable Systems - Joshua Liner Gallery, New York City USA

2019 

 Axioma de Constructibilidad - Articruz, Panama City PANAMA
 Distance, Speed, Time, Formula - Danysz Gallery, Shanghai CHINA

2020 

 Contactless - Albertz Benda, New York City USA
 Big Time Data - RGR Galery, Mexico City MEXICO

2021 

 Casa Variable - Danysz Gallery, Paris FRANCE
 Veladura Digital - Galería Javier López & Fer Francés (The Playground), Madrid SPAIN

2022 

 Convergencias (with Elías Crespin) - Galería RGR, CDMX MÉXICO
 Manipulable - Gallery Common, Tokyo JAPAN
 Metallic Contact - Albertz Benda, New York City USA

2023 

Kosmos - Control Gallery, Los Ángeles USA

Group exhibitions

2013

Venganza – group exhibition with Sozyone Gonzalez & Demsky333 at Celal Gallery, Paris – February / March

2016 

 Truck Art Project - Madrid, Spain
 Painting / Object - Library Street Collective, Los Angeles CA, USA
 The New Vanguard -  Museum of Art and History (MOAH), Lancaster CA, USA
 Welcome Back  - Colab Gallery, Wheil Am Rhein GERMANY
 Vitality and Verve  - Long Beach Museum of Art, Long Beach CA, USA
 Spectra - Marion Gallery, Panama City PANAMA

2017 

 Scope Art Fair - With Mirus Gallery, Miami, FL
 Interferences, Contemporary Op & Kinetic Art - GR Gallery, New York, NY
 Ultra-Plasticism - PBX Creativa, Madrid, Spain
 Chromadynamica Dimensional - Mesa Contemporary Arts Center, Mesa, AZ, USA

2018 

 Summer Mixer - Joshua Liner Gallery, New York, NY
 Beyond the Streets - Los Angeles, CA
 Art from the Streets - ArtScience Museum - SINGAPORE

2019 

 Vibrations - Danysz Gallery, Paris FRANCE
 Your Favorite Artist’s Favorite Artist II - Joshua Liner Gallery, New York City USA 
 From the World, Made in Lisboa - Underdogs Gallery, Lisbon PORTUGAL
 Dream Box - MIMA Museum, Brussels BELGIUM

2021 

 MISA.art - König Galerie, Berlin GERMANY

2022 

 Endless Summer - Albertz Benda, Los Angeles USA

2023 

 Beyond the Streets - Saatchi Gallery, London UK

References

External links 

Spanish contemporary artists
Living people
1986 births
Artists from Buenos Aires